Tides is the second studio album by German electronic music producer Arovane, released on 1 June 2000 by City Centre Offices.

Critical reception

Resident Advisor placed Tides at number 99 on its list of the 100 best albums of the 2000s; in an accompanying write-up, critic Todd Burns dubbed the album "a small masterpiece of ambient music that seemed to have nary a Max/MSP patch in sight." In 2017, Tides was ranked at number 44 on Pitchforks list of the 50 best IDM albums of all time.

Track listing

Personnel
Credits are adapted from the album's liner notes.

 Uwe Zahn – production
 Bettina Hovgaard-Petersen – cover artwork
 Christian Kleine – guitar
 Oliver Schulze – cover artwork

References

External links
 

2000 albums
Arovane albums